Fábio de Jesus Oliveira (born 30 March 1981), known as Fábio Oliveira, is a former footballer who played as a midfielder. Born and raised in Brazil, he has been naturalized by Togo and played for that national team.

Biography
Fábio Oliveira was born in Ipatinga, a municipality located in eastern Minas Gerais state, Brazil.

He was signed by the Omani side Al Oruba Sur in July 2005, and returned to Brazil for CTE Colatina in February 2006.

He signed a three-year contract for Cianorte in January 2007. He was loaned to Oeste in March 2008 until June 2008. In June, he was signed by Toledo Colônia Work and in August signed by Botafogo-SP in 1-year loan. In June 2009 he was signed by Linense in 1-year contract and in February 2010 signed by Sorocaba. In July, he was signed by América-RN and in January 2011 signed a 1-year contract with Treze.

International career
Fábio Oliveira and other Brazilian-born played for the Togo national team on June and July 2003 in a 2004 African Cup of Nations Qualifying matches against Cape Verde, Kenya and Mauritania. Fábio Oliveira "remember that played against Cape Verde and Mauritania". He also played for Togo against the Ghanaian club Asante Kotoko in a friendly match on June 29, 2003 in Stade de Kégué, Lomé.

References

External links

1981 births
Living people
Association football midfielders
Togolese footballers
Togo international footballers
Brazilian footballers
Sportspeople from Minas Gerais
People from Ipatinga
Avaí FC players
Associação Chapecoense de Futebol players
Al-Orouba SC players
Oeste Futebol Clube players
Botafogo Futebol Clube (SP) players
Clube Atlético Sorocaba players
América Futebol Clube (RN) players
Clube Atlético Linense players
Treze Futebol Clube players
Águia de Marabá Futebol Clube players
Brazilian expatriate footballers
Brazilian expatriate sportspeople in Oman
Expatriate footballers in Oman
Naturalized citizens of Togo
21st-century Togolese people